Lina Volonghi (4 September 1914 – 24 February 1991) was an Italian stage, television and film actress.

Life and career 
Born in Genoa as Giuseppina Angela Volonghi, a promising junior swimming champion in her youth, Volonghi started her acting career in 1933, when she debuted in the comedy play I manezzi pe' majâ na figgia, in the Gilberto Govi's stage company. After six years she left the Govi's company and moved to Rome, where she joined the Anton Giulio Bragaglia's company Theatre of the Arts.  In these years she gained critical appreciation for her versatility in comic and dramatic roles. She later worked on stage with Luchino Visconti, Giorgio Strehler, Luigi Squarzina among others. Also active in films, in TV and radio dramas and series, she retired in 1986 following a sudden heart attack. Volonghi was married to actor Carlo Cataneo.

Filmography

References

External links 

Actors from Genoa
Italian stage actresses
Italian film actresses
Italian television actresses
1914 births
1991 deaths
20th-century Italian actresses